MiG Alley Ace (shown as Mig Alley ACE on the Commodore title screen) is an air combat video game published by MicroProse for the Atari 8-bit family in 1983. A Commodore 64 port followed in 1984.

Gameplay

MiG Alley Ace is a head-to-head flight simulator by Andy Hollis. It is based on the combat in MiG Alley.

Reception
David Patton reviewed the game for Computer Gaming World, and stated that "While this game lacks too many features to be called a true flight simulator (it has no attitude indicator, no "weather problems", no runways, no player control over ailerons and rudders, etc. . .), the excellent aerial dogfight action and Korean war setting make it worthy purchase for both the war gamer who is looking for a good arcade experience and for the arcader who is ready to go to war."

In 1996, Computer Gaming World declared MiG Alley Ace the 129th-best computer game ever released.

Reviews
Computer Gamer #6 1985-09

References

External links
Review in Family Computing
Review in Page 6
Review in Page 6

1983 video games
Atari 8-bit family games
Cold War video games
Combat flight simulators
Commodore 64 games
Korean War video games
MicroProse games
Split-screen multiplayer games
Video games developed in the United States